Tamil is the second most spoken language, after Kannada in the city of Bangalore in Karnataka, India. There are two main dialects of Tamil spoken in Bangalore – the Tigala dialect and Bhovi dialect.

Notes 

Languages of Karnataka
Tamil dialects